Moshe Lugasi (born 4 February 1991) is an Israeli footballer.

Career
Lugasi started playing in the Maccabi Tel Aviv youth academy. He was promoted to the senior team in 2011 alongside few other young players.
During the 2012/2013 season Lugasi tried to pick himself a regular place in the first team. On 18 February 2013 Lugasi won a match against Bnei Yehuda after an absolutely sunning strike in the 98th minute from the corner of the box into the top woodwork and in. Maccabi won this game at the score 3–2. That goal later appeared to be crucial for Maccabi in the run for the title in that season.

Honours
Maccabi Tel Aviv
Israeli Premier League (1): 2012–13

External links

1991 births
Living people
Israeli Jews
Israeli footballers
People from Kiryat Gat
Footballers from Southern District (Israel)
Maccabi Tel Aviv F.C. players
Beitar Jerusalem F.C. players
Maccabi Petah Tikva F.C. players
Maccabi Netanya F.C. players
Hapoel Ashkelon F.C. players
Hapoel Ramat Gan F.C. players
Israeli Premier League players
Israeli people of Moroccan-Jewish descent
Israel under-21 international footballers
Association football midfielders